Tricase is a town and comune in the province of Lecce, part of the Apulia region of south-east Italy. It is located in the Salento traditional region. In Tricase have Cardinale Giovanni Panico General Hospital.

The area that is in between Otranto and Santa Maria di Leuca is part of the Regional Natural Coastal Park of "Costa Otranto - Santa Maria di Leuca e Bosco di Tricase" wanted by the Apulia  Region in 2008. This territory has numerous natural and historical attractions such as Ciolo, which is a rocky cove.

History
Tricase is the site of a castle and of a Quercia Vallonea, an oak which is amongst the oldest trees in Italy, dating from the 13th century.

References

External links
Official website

Cities and towns in Apulia
Localities of Salento
Displaced persons camps in the aftermath of World War II